The 1936 Western State Teachers Hilltoppers football team represented Western State Teachers College (later renamed Western Michigan University) as an independent during the 1936 college football season.  In their eighth season under head coach Mike Gary, the Hilltoppers compiled a 2–5 record and were outscored by their opponents, 80 to 60. Halfback George Ockstadt was the team captain.

Schedule

References

Western State Teachers
Western Michigan Broncos football seasons
Western State Teachers Hilltoppers football